IV is the fourth studio album by musical group Angband. This is their debut with the new singer Tim Aymar (Control Denied). The album is released on July 24, 2020 via Pure Steel Records. A lyric video for the song "Nights Of Tehran" was released on July 1, 2020.

Track listing

Personnel 
Tim Aymar - vocals
Mahyar Dean - guitars, bass
Ramin Rahimi - drums, percussions
 Recorded at Mahyar Dean's home studio & Charse Studio in Tehran
Vocals Recorded by Adam Fitz at Tonic Recording Studios and
Michael Proctor at The Doctor's Office Studio in USA
 Mixed & Mastered by Mahyar Dean
Pasha Hanjani - Nay 
Cover art - Maziar Dean

References 

2020 albums
Angband (band) albums